The 2001 NCAA Division I Field Hockey Championship was the 21st women's collegiate field hockey tournament organized by the National Collegiate Athletic Association, to determine the top college field hockey team in the United States. The Michigan Wolverines won their first championship, defeating the Maryland Terrapins in the final. The semifinals and championship were hosted by Kent State University at Dix Stadium in Kent, Ohio.

Bracket

References 

2001
Field Hockey
2001 in women's field hockey
2001 in sports in Ohio
Women's sports in Ohio